is a district located in Niigata Prefecture, Japan.

As of July 1, 2019, the district has an estimated population of 4,190 and a density of 94.4 persons per km2. The total area is 44.38 km2.

Towns and villages 
The district consists of one town:

 Izumozaki

History 

 Before the Edo Period, Santō District was part of the now-defunct Koshi District.

Recent mergers 
 On April 1, 2005 - The towns of Koshiji and Mishima were merged into the expanded city of Nagaoka.
 On January 1, 2006 - The towns of Teradomari and Yoita, and the village of Washima were also merged into the expanded city of Nagaoka.

After two successful mergers with Nagaoka during an eight-month period, the district has an estimated population of 5,565 and a density of 125.39 persons per km2. The total area is 44.38 km2.

Districts in Niigata Prefecture